Maryland Route 341 (MD 341) is a state highway in the U.S. state of Maryland.  Known as Race Street, the state highway runs  from MD 16 north to MD 343 within the city of Cambridge in Dorchester County.  The part of Race Street that is now MD 341 was constructed in the mid-1910s as one of the original state roads and designated as part of MD 16 in 1927.  MD 341 was assigned to the road after MD 16 bypassed Cambridge in the 1960s.

Route description

MD 341 begins at an intersection with MD 16 (Church Creek Road) and Maple Dam Road near the southern edge of the city of Cambridge adjacent to Cambridge-South Dorchester High School.  Maple Dam Road heads south toward Blackwater National Wildlife Refuge. MD 16 heads west toward Church Creek and east on a bypass of Cambridge toward U.S. Route 50.  MD 341 heads north as a two-lane undivided road, passing through fields before transitioning to residential subdivisions and then residential neighborhoods as the highway approaches the center of Cambridge.  The state highway reaches its northern terminus at an intersection with MD 343 (Washington Street). Race Street continues north toward downtown Cambridge as a municipal street.

History
Race Street south of Washington Street was included as part of the Cambridge–Church Creek highway designated for improvement as a state road by the Maryland State Roads Commission in 1909.  That  highway was completed in 1915.  The highway was designated part of MD 16, along with Washington Street east toward East New Market, in 1927.  When MD 16 was rerouted to bypass Cambridge in 1967, MD 341 was assigned to the Race Street portion of the bypassed route.

Junction list

See also

References

External links

MDRoads: MD 341

341
Maryland Route 341